The Legend of the Piave (Italian: La leggenda del piave) is a 1952 Italian war drama film directed by Riccardo Freda and starring Gianna Maria Canale, Carlo Giustini and Renato Baldini. It takes its name from the 1918 patriotic song of the same name, although there is little connection between the song's lyrics and the plot of the film. It was filmed over four weeks, mostly at the Titanus Studios in Rome. The film's sets were designed by the art director Alfredo Montori.

Synopsis
During the First World War, countess Giovanna Dolfin discovers that her husband the count is in fact an opportunist who has only enlisted in the Italian Army in order to carry out black market activities. She plans to leave him but he ultimately redeems himself following the disastrous Battle of Caporetto and the subsequent fighting on the Piave River, where he is badly wounded.

Cast
 Gianna Maria Canale as Contessa Giovanna Dolfin
 Carlo Giustini as 	Conte Riccardo Dolfin
 Renato Baldini as 	Don Carlo, capellano
 Edoardo Toniolo as 	Ufficiale Austriaco
 Enrico Viarisio as Caporale Mainardi
 Duccio Sissia as Piccolo Mario, figlio dei conti Dolfin
 Giorgio Consolini as 	Soldato Cantante
 Luigi De Filippo as 	Giorgio, un soldato
 Elena Cotta as 	Gabriella
 Marina Recchia as Contadina

References

Bibliography 
 Curti, Roberto. Riccardo Freda: The Life and Works of a Born Filmmaker. McFarland, 2017.

External links 
 

1952 films
Italian war films
1952 war films
1950s Italian-language films
Films directed by Riccardo Freda
Italian black-and-white films
1950s Italian films
World War I films set on the Italian Front
Films set in 1917
Films set in Verona

it:La leggenda del Piave (film 1952)